Jonathon James Boult (born 29 November 1985) is a former New Zealand cricketer who played for Northern Districts from 2009 to 2017.

Boult made his first-class cricket debut for Northern Districts against Auckland in March 2009. He was named as twelfth man for New Zealand's first Test against India later that month.

His younger brother, Trent Boult, plays for New Zealand and Northern Districts.

Notes

External links
 

1985 births
Living people
New Zealand cricketers
Northern Districts cricketers
Ngāi Tahu people
Ngāti Porou people
Ngāi Te Rangi people